The Pleasance is a theatre, bar, sports and recreation complex in Edinburgh, Scotland, situated on a street of the same name. It is owned by the University of Edinburgh, and for nine months of the year it serves the Edinburgh University Students' Association as a societies centre, sports complex, student union bar and entertainment venue.

Every August, it is converted into one of the main venues for the Edinburgh Festival Fringe. The Pleasance Theatre Trust operate the venue during this time, and in this guise the complex is sometimes referred to as Pleasance Edinburgh to distinguish it from a sister venue, also called The Pleasance, that the trust opened in Islington in London in 1995.

Facilities

The Pleasance complex consists of a number of separate buildings, with the main block situated around a central, cobbled courtyard.

The main block houses two bars, The Pleasance Bar and The Cabaret Bar, situated in adjoining rooms with a removable partition in-between. Upstairs from these, also in the main block, is the main Pleasance Theatre. Unlike other university buildings, all these spaces are open to the general public year round, without the need for student identification. The Cabaret Bar and Theatre host a programme of live events throughout the year, including the Pleasance Sessions music festival and regular live music, comedy, spoken word and poetry nights. It is also home to Edinburgh Folk Club.

The rest of the complex contains rooms and meeting spaces which can be booked out for society use. In a building towards the rear of the plot is the Pleasance sports centre and gym.

Edinburgh Festival Fringe

For the Edinburgh Festival Fringe, the whole complex is converted into a variety of theatre spaces. The main theatre, capacity 320, and renamed Pleasance One for the duration of the Fringe, is one of these. The Cabaret Bar (capacity 175) is another. Other spaces range in size from the 750-seat Pleasance Grand (in the sports centre) to the 50-capacity Cellar. For the purposes of the Fringe brochure, these spaces collectively are called Pleasance Courtyard, and listed as venue 33. 
The programming is of a high standard, featuring international acts, and tends towards comedy and cabaret. The courtyard becomes "the biggest beer garden in the city" for the month of August.

The Pleasance Theatre Trust also operate out of Potterrow, an entirely separate student building on another site, but branded as "Pleasance Dome" during the Fringe.

References

External links
 
 Pleasance Trust website

Theatres in Edinburgh
Edinburgh Comedy Festival
Buildings and structures of the University of Edinburgh